The South Seven Conference is a high school athletic conference comprising six schools in the southern Illinois.

History 

The South Seven was formed in 1939 when Centralia and Mt. Vernon departed the North Egyptian Conference and joined Marion, Benton, Harrisburg, Herrin and West Frankfort (hence, the name of the conference since it only had 7 members).  Carbondale joined the conference in 1965, but the name of the conference was not changed.

In 1993, the four smallest schools (Benton, Harrisburg, Herrin and West Frankfort) departed for the River-to-River Conference.  Edwardsville and O'Fallon were added, with the former being a short-term replacement while a permanent member was sought.  In 1995, Edwardsville left for the Southwestern Conference and was replaced by Cahokia.  Over the next couple of years, O'Fallon would continue to grow to the point that it was much larger than the rest of the schools, and in 2000 the Panthers also left for the Southwestern Conference, replaced by Belleville Althoff.  Throughout the changes, the "South Seven" moniker has remained even though the conference never had exactly 7 member schools in almost 50 years.  That was to change for the 2018-19 season, when Granite City was due to leave the Southwestern Conference and join the South Seven, but a vote in March 2018 (a 3-3 tie) denied Granite City's entry into the conference until at least 2020. This vote was based heavily on scheduling issues and the amount of traveling for most of the teams in the conference.

Member Schools

Former members of the South Seven Conference

Membership timeline

See also
 List of Illinois High School Association member conferences

References 

High school sports conferences and leagues in the United States
Illinois high school sports conferences
High school sports in Illinois